Inés San Martín (Rosario, Santa Fe, 1986) is an Argentine journalist, former co-editor and head of the Crux newspaper in Rome between 2014 and 2022. As of September 2022, she is the VP of Marketing and Communications of The Pontifical Mission Societies USA.

Graduated with a master's degree in communication from Austral University began working as a journalist in the Valores Religiosos Clarín in October 2012. She was responsible for international communication for World Youth Day 2013.

In June 2014, she started working on Crux, a newly created project promoted by The Boston Globe and led by John L. Allen Jr., that became an independent newspaper in April 2016. San Martín was a correspondent at the Vatican until July 2018, when she became responsible for the newspaper in Rome and co-editor with Allen. She has traveled with Pope Francis to more than 30 countries.

She has given talks on Pope Francis, the Vatican and Church communications in the United States, Chile, Mexico, Italy and Ireland.

References

External links 

Argentine women journalists
Living people
1986 births
People from Rosario, Santa Fe
Argentine Roman Catholics